Tritomegas sexmaculatus is a shield bug from the genus Tritomegas, which has length of 6–8 mm.

Range 
Shield bugs of the Tritomegas sexmaculatus species have been observed from the west coast of Europe to Iran.

References

Cydnidae